Marquess of Santa Cruz sometimes known as Marquess of Santa Cruz de Mudela, is a hereditary title in the Peerage of Spain, accompanied by the dignity of Grandee and granted in 1569 by Philip II to Álvaro de Bazán, an important admiral who defeated the Ottoman Empire at the Battle of Lepanto. It takes its name from the town of Santa Cruz de Mudela, in Southern Spain.

Marquesses of Santa Cruz (1569)

Álvaro de Bazán y Guzmán, 1st Marquess of Santa Cruz
Álvaro de Bazán y Benavides, 2nd Marquess of Santa Cruz
Álvaro de Bazán y Manrique de Lara, 3rd Marquess of Santa Cruz
María Eugenia de Bazán y Doria, 4th Marchioness of Santa Cruz
Francisco Diego de Bazán y Doria, 5th Marquess of Santa Cruz
José Bernardino de Bazán y Pimentel, 6th Marquess of Santa Cruz
Álvaro Antonio de Bazán y Pimentel, 7th Marquess of Santa Cruz
Pedro de Silva-Bazán y Alagón, 8th Marquess of Santa Cruz
José Joaquín De Silva-Bazán y Sarmiento, 9th Maruquess of Santa Cruz
José Gabriel de Silva-Bazán y Waldstein, 10th Marquess of Santa Cruz
Francisco de Borja de Silva-Bazán y Téllez-Girón, 11th Marquess of Santa Cruz
Álvaro de Silva-Bazán y Fernández de Córdova, 12th Marquess of Santa Cruz
Mariano de Silva y Carvajal, 13th Marquess of Santa Cruz
Casilda de Silva y Fernández de Henestrosa, 14th Marchioness of Santa Cruz
Álvaro Fernández-Villaverde y Silva, 15th Marquess of Santa Cruz

See also
List of current Grandees of Spain

References 

Marquesses of Spain
Grandees of Spain
Lists of Spanish nobility